The 1910 Chinese expedition to Tibet or the Chinese invasion of Tibet in 1910 was a military campaign of the Qing dynasty to establish direct rule in Tibet in early 1910. The expedition occupied Lhasa on February 12 and officially deposed the 13th Dalai Lama on the 25th.

Qing rule of Tibet was established in the early 18th century after the 1720 Chinese expedition to Tibet. 

After the British expedition to Tibet in 1904 and the Sino-British treaty in 1906, the Qing regime sent the 1910 expedition to Tibet to assert full control. As Professor Dawa Norbu stated, the British expedition and Treaty of Lhasa led to the Qing government to ensure that they held firm control over Tibet. Afterwards, the Dalai Lama then fled to India.

After the outbreak of the Xinhai Revolution and the Xinhai Lhasa turmoil in 1911–1912, the Qing dynasty collapsed and was succeeded by the Republic of China (1912–1949).

See also 
Tibet under Qing rule
Xinhai Lhasa turmoil
Chinese expedition to Tibet (1720)
1905 Tibetan Rebellion
Zhao Erfeng
Tibet (1912–51)

References 

Conflicts in 1910
Wars involving the Qing dynasty
Wars involving Tibet
1910 in China
China–Tibet relations